The 1981 European Karate Championships was held in Venice, Italy, from May 2–4, 1981.

Medallists

Men's Competition

Individual

Team

Women's competition

References

1981
International sports competitions hosted by Italy
Karate competitions in Italy
European Karate Championships
European championships in 1981
Karate Championships
Karate Championships